Bob Harris (born 1942), the "Voice of the Blue Devils" is a Hall of Fame-inducted play-by-play announcer for Duke University men's basketball and football teams. In his 40 seasons at Duke, Harris has broadcast 456 consecutive Duke football games (2015) and 1,358 Duke basketball games (2016). His 1,980 game career includes 41 ACC men's basketball tournament games, 126 NCAA men's basketball tournament games in 35 trips, 13 Final Four appearances, 11 national championship games and 5 NCAA Champion titles.

Harris was inducted into the Stanly County Sports Hall of Fame in 1993. He was inducted into the North Carolina Sports Hall of Fame in 2006. Harris was named the 2011 North Carolina Sportscaster of the Year by the National Sportscasters and Sportswriters Association, winning for the third time, following wins in 1988 and 1991. Harris has said, "I'm a fan. A fan with a microphone." On June 25, 2016, Harris received the prestigious "Order of the Long Leaf Pine" award from NC Governor Pat McCrory for 40 years of service to the state.

Born in 1942, Harris grew up in Albemarle, North Carolina. Beginning in 1960, Harris attended North Carolina State University for two years before leaving college to work for Goodyear. He later returned to his hometown for a job selling insurance, where he began working part-time for WZKY, in 1967.  Harris volunteered to provide coverage of local football for the station, which led to him being hired as a full-time sports announcer, as well as sports director for eight years.

In 1975, Harris and his family relocated to Durham where Harris had been offered a sales job on WDNC. A week later, he was hosting a sports talk show. Eventually, he served as color commentator to then-Duke sportcaster, Add Penfield, broadcasting Duke football and basketball games. When Penfield experienced health problems, Harris filled in. Penfield retired in the spring of 1976, opening the door for Harris to become the "Voice of the Blue Devils" beginning with the 1976 football season.

Nationally, Harris is best known for his play-by-play of Christian Laettner's buzzer beater in Duke's victory over the University of Kentucky in the 1992 East Regional of the NCAA basketball tournament. 
ESPN considers the 1992 East Regional Final in Philadelphia the "greatest college basketball game ever" played. Harris' description of "The Shot" from the radio broadcast is most often featured with the archival video footage, replacing that of the original television commentators:

In December, 2010, Harris published his autobiography, "How Sweet It Is!: From the Cotton Mill to the Crows' Nest", recounting his storied career as the "Voice of the Blue Devils". He has been courtside to witness all five of Duke's National Championship wins. Included with the book is an 80-minute CD that features some of Harris’ interviews, including Muhammad Ali and Red Skelton, along with famous radio calls like “The Shot.” .

The book, which Harris spent five years writing, was scheduled for a March 2010 release, but delayed until December.
"It was all set to be released, but then Duke won another national championship." Harris said, "So I had to add another chapter for obvious reasons."

Harris is active in book signings, often for the benefit of charities. He participated in a "red carpet book signing event" for Pantry, Inc. as part of their "Battle for Bean Street" competition, with the prize being a $20,000 corporate donation to the Duke Cancer Institute. Recently, Harris partnered with Kangeroo Express to host "Salute Our Troops", a fundraiser that raised $2.5 million in support of military service men and women. Reflecting on the retirement of a fellow broadcaster, Harris had this to say: "As long as my health is good and as long as my passion is still there for the games, the broadcasts and the kids, and as long as I'm still doing the job that Duke needs and wants me to do, I really don't want to retire anytime soon because I have fun doing it". 
Says, Harris, "I don't want to rust away. I want to wear out.”

On Oct. 15, 2011 Harris celebrated his 400th consecutive Duke Football radio broadcast. “It just means that the good Lord has given me good health for 36 plus years and enabled me to be there,” says Harris. “It was not something that I had as a goal. I’m so happy that I’ve got a job like mine and I get to do something that I love.” During his football career, Harris has worked with nine coaches, has called plays for All-Americas and future NFL players. After 456 games, Harris maintains there is still an element of excitement to this work. “A Saturday afternoon in Wallace Wade Stadium in late October is just as exciting to me as a Wednesday night in February in Cameron Indoor Stadium,” says Harris.

On Feb. 9, 2012, Harris' call of a game between the University of North Carolina Tarheels and the Duke Blue Devils was said to rival his call of Laettner's "shot":  
            
Harris called his 1,200th Duke Men's Basketball game on February 16, 2012, an exciting game with the team overcoming a twenty-point deficit to defeat Harris' alma mater, North Carolina State, 78-73.

Harris has advised young broadcasters: "Don’t try to be the next somebody. Be the best “your name” that you can be. Listen to all these other broadcasters, listen to the veterans to see how they do things, what they say, how they describe things...I think sometimes the younger people get a little bit antsy. They wanna have it happen now, and it’s not going to. You’ve got to pay your dues."

Lewis Bowling, author and teacher at N.C. Central University and Duke University, declares that Harris is "a favorite among fans, and Duke athletes through the years have looked to this affable man as a father figure and friend. With Bob Harris' voice in Duke fans' ears, many of us can say to him, "How sweet it is!".

References

External links
 Bob Harris' entry in the North Carolina Sports Hall of Fame
 Bob Harris website
 WRAL Anchor Bill Leslie interviews Bob Harris
 "My Carolina Today" host Valonda Calloway discusses the Bean St. Charity promotion and Bob's book

American sports announcers
College basketball announcers in the United States
College football announcers
Duke Blue Devils football announcers
Duke Blue Devils men's basketball
North Carolina State University alumni
1942 births
Living people